Dobrava is a settlement on the Adriatic coast in the Municipality of Izola in the Littoral region of Slovenia. The Belvedere tourist resort and camping are nearby.

See also 
 Dobrava (toponym)

References

External links 
Dobrava on Geopedia

Populated places in the Municipality of Izola
Slovenian Riviera